Aripuanã is a municipality in the state of Mato Grosso in the Central-West Region of Brazil. It is located on the banks of the Aripuanã River.

The city is served by Aripuanã Airport.

The municipality contains the  Rio Flor do Prado Ecological Station, a fully protected environmental unit created in 2003.
It also holds part of the  Guariba-Roosevelt Extractive Reserve, a sustainable use unit created in 1996.

References

Municipalities in Mato Grosso